In invariant theory, a branch of algebra, given a group G, a covariant is a G-equivariant polynomial map  between linear representations V, W of G. It is a generalization of a classical convariant, which is a homogeneous polynomial map from the space of binary m-forms to the space of binary p-forms (over the complex numbers) that is -equivariant.

See also 
module of covariants
Invariant of a binary form#Terminology
Transvectant - method/process of constructing covariants

References 

 
 

Invariant theory